(born October 31, 1969, Nagano, Nagano prefecture), Japan is an attorney and former President of the Girl Scouts of Japan, a member of the World Board of the World Association of Girl Guides and Girl Scouts since 2011, and Senior Manager at the Japan Business Federation.

Wada led disaster relief fundraising efforts in the aftermath of the 2011 Tōhoku earthquake and tsunami, and under her guidance, Girl Scouts of Nagano started a project to support children with needs in partnership with Armenian Girl Guides of the National Union of Girl Guides and Girl Scouts of Armenia.

She studied at the Graduate School of Law and Politics of the University of Tokyo, as well as Waseda University and Knox College. She lives in Shinjuku-ku, Tokyo. She was admitted, or permitted to practice law, in New York State in 2004 via Georgetown University.

References

External links

https://scout.org/node/107141
http://www.girlguides.org.sg/cos/o.x?c=/ggs/pagetree&func=view&rid=6657
https://1000000forjapangs.wordpress.com/category/japan/

Scouting in Japan
Living people
Waseda University alumni
University of Tokyo alumni
1969 births